Ancylolomia minutella is a moth in the family Crambidae. It was described by Turati in 1926. It is found in Libya.

References

Ancylolomia
Moths described in 1926
Moths of Africa